All My Life is the third album by singer Jocelyn Enriquez.  It was released on February 11, 2003, on Jocelyn's own label, JEM Entertainment.  All My Life includes the hit singles, "No Way No How" and "Why."

Track listing

Charts
Singles - Billboard (North America)

References

External links
 [ All Music: All My Life]

2003 albums
Jocelyn Enriquez albums